La señora de enfrente ("The Lady in Front") is a 1945 Mexican film. It stars Sara García.

Cast
 Sara García as Lastenia Cortazano
 Carmen Montejo as Gilberta Madrigal
 Rafael Baledón as Antonio R. Olmedo
 José Pidal as Señor Rodríguez
 Emma Roldán as Martina
 Arturo Soto Rangel as Padre Juan
 José Morcillo as Judge
 Natalia Ortiz as Señora Martínez
 Magdalena Labastida as María
 Consuelo Segarra as Efigenia
 Rosa Castro as Nena
 Lupe del Castillo as Nena's mother

External links
 

1945 films
1940s Spanish-language films
Mexican black-and-white films
Mexican comedy-drama films
1940s Mexican films